The Roesch House is a historic U.S. home located at 1320 Highland Avenue, Melbourne, Florida. The house is owned by The Rossetter House Foundation, Inc., managed by the Florida Historical Society, and part of the Historic Rossetter House Museum.

The house was owned by William Roesch, the first mayor of Eau Gallie, Florida.

Notes

Gallery

External links

Websites
Historic Rossetter House Museum History. The Roesch House is part of the Historic Rossetter House Museum and is listed on the museum website.

Eau Gallie, Florida
Houses in Brevard County, Florida
Buildings and structures in Melbourne, Florida